Dammartin-sur-Tigeaux (literally Dammartin on Tigeaux) is a commune in the Seine-et-Marne department' in the Île-de-France region in north-central France.

Demographics
Inhabitants of Dammartin-sur-Tigeaux are called Dammartinois.

See also
Communes of the Seine-et-Marne department

References

External links

1999 Land Use, from IAURIF (Institute for Urban Planning and Development of the Paris-Île-de-France région) 

Communes of Seine-et-Marne